Olympic is one of the 20 constituencies of the Yau Tsim Mong District Council in Hong Kong. The seat elects one member of the council every four years. The boundary is loosely based on the areas around Olympian City.

Councillors represented

Election results

2010s

Citations

References
2011 District Council Election Results (Yau Tsim Mong)

Constituencies of Hong Kong
Constituencies of Yau Tsim Mong District Council
2011 establishments in Hong Kong
Constituencies established in 2011
Tai Kok Tsui
Olympian City